The North Carolina A&T–Winston-Salem State rivalry was a series of athletic competitions between historic rivals North Carolina Agricultural and Technical State University and Winston-Salem State University, both of which are located in the state of North Carolina. The intensity of the rivalry is driven by the proximity of the two schools, as both are only 30 miles apart via U.S. Interstate 40; the size of the two schools, as North Carolina A&T is the largest Historically Black College and University in the state and Winston-Salem State is the third largest; coaching personnel, and conference alignments, as both schools at one time were both members of either the Central Intercollegiate Athletic Association (CIAA) or the Mid-Eastern Athletic Conference (MEAC). Although a less intense and bitter rivalry than that shared between North Carolina A&T and North Carolina Central University, both A&T and WSSU fans placed great emphasis on this rivalry.

Since Winston-Salem State's 2010 decision to discontinue the transition to the NCAA's Division I citing financial reasons, this rivalry has been placed on hold for the foreseeable future. The schools announced on November 23, 2020, that they would renew the rivalry with a game on September 7, 2024 at NC A&T's Truist Stadium, formerly Aggie Stadium.

Football
The most prominent sport in the rivalry is football. The two teams have been competing against each other since 1952. 
In the most recent contest, Winston-Salem State defeated the Aggies in a 21–14 come from behind victory in North Carolina A&T's Aggie Stadium. The two schools have played 46 times since 1952, with periods of time in the 1970s and early 2000s where the two teams did not meet. Since the beginning of the series, North Carolina A&T leads with an all-time record of 34 wins to 12.

In the early years of the series, the A&T dominated Winston-Salem State with an 18-game winning streak from 1952 to 1969. In 1977, under the leadership of coach William "Bill" Hayes, Winston-Salem State earned their first win against the Aggies with a 33-14 victory. Winston-Salem State earned 4 consecutive victories in the series against A&T from 1982 through 1985. On September 12, 1981, Winston-Salem State was the first opponent to play in the then newly built Aggie Stadium. The contest was held in front of an overflow crowd of more than 23,000 fans.

From 2000 to 2005, the series was placed on hiatus. In 2006, Winston-Salem State defeated A&T 41-14 in Greensboro, bringing the all-time record to 33-9 in favor of the Aggies. The September 1, 2007 contest set a Bowman Gray Stadium attendance record of 22,000 spectators in attendance. The game saw the Rams defeat the Aggies 28-7.

Game results

See also  
 List of NCAA college football rivalry games

References 

College football rivalries in the United States
North Carolina A&T Aggies
Winston-Salem State Rams
1952 establishments in North Carolina
College sports in North Carolina